Erik Gervais (born January 24, 1973) is a Canadian sprint canoer who competed in the mid-1990s. At the 1996 Summer Olympics in Atlanta, he was eliminated in the repechages of the K-1 1000 m event.

References
 Sports-Reference.com profile

1973 births
Canadian male canoeists
Canoeists at the 1996 Summer Olympics
Living people
Olympic canoeists of Canada
Place of birth missing (living people)
[[Born:Dabbery Valleyfield
[[Family:2 kids (Jean-Nicolas Gervais and Emilianne Gervais)